The  59th Coast Artillery Regiment, later the 59th Air Defense Artillery Regiment, was a regiment in the United States Army. It served as a heavy artillery regiment in France in World War I, and was in the Battle of Corregidor, Philippine Islands, in World War II.

History

World War I
Constituted 1 December 1917 in the Regular Army as the 59th Artillery (Coast Artillery Corps) (CAC) and organized 1 January 1918 at Fort Hamilton, New York from existing Regular Army and New York National Guard Companies of Coast Artillery. Moved to France March 1918, armed there with 24 British-made 8-inch howitzers, served with the 32nd Brigade (CAC) on the Western Front, including support of I and IV Army Corps. Returned to the US in January 1919 and later moved to Camp Lewis, Washington state (National Guard Companies demobilized at Camp Upton, New York during January and February 1919 but regiment continued on active status).

World War II
During the Philippines campaign (1941–1942) the regiment garrisoned much of the Harbor Defenses of Manila and Subic Bays, along with the 91st Coast Artillery and 92nd Coast Artillery of the Philippine Scouts. Its commander in World War II was Colonel Paul Bunker. It operated at least the following batteries, at Fort Mills, Corregidor unless otherwise noted:
 A Battery Hearn
 B Battery Crockett
 C Battery Wheeler
 D Battery Cheney
 E Battery Fort Drum (El Fraile Island)
 F Battery Smith
 G Battery Fort Hughes
 H Battery Geary
 I Battery (AA) Fort Hughes
 K Battery James

Lineage

 (Service Battery; Headquarters Detachment and Combat train, 1st, 2nd and 3rd Battalions inactivated 30 September 1922 at Fort Mills, Corregidor, Philippine Islands, in the Harbor Defenses of Manila and Subic Bays. Batteries G, and H activated 11 October 1922 at Fort Mills). Redesignated 20 February 1924 as the 59th Coast Artillery (Tractor Drawn); Concurrently batteries C, D, E, and F activated at Fort Mills. In 1935 the regiment was reorganized and redesignated as Harbor Defense. Remainder of regiment activated 30 May 1941 at Fort Mills.
 Heavily engaged in the Battle of Corregidor and other engagements of the Philippines campaign (1941–1942); surrendered 6 May 1942 to Japanese forces on Corregidor Island, Philippine Islands.
 Inactivated 2 April 1946 at Fort Mills. 
 Redesignated 26 December 1947 as the 59th Antiaircraft Artillery Automatic Weapons Battalion and activated 1 January 1948 at Fort Bliss, Texas. 
 Redesignated 24 February 1953 as the 59th Antiaircraft Artillery Battalion. Inactivated 1 September 1958 at Fort Bliss.
 Reorganized and redesignated 31 July 1959 as the 59th Artillery, a parent regiment under the Combat Arms Regimental System.

Distinctive unit insignia
 Description
A Gold color metal and enamel device  in height overall consisting of a shield blazoned: Per fess vair and Argent, in base a thistle Proper. Attached above from a wreath Argent and Azure a demi-lion rampant Gules grasping in dexter claw a sword Or.  Attached above and to the sides of the shield a Gold scroll inscribed “” in Red letters.
 Symbolism
The vair on the shield is from the arms of the Coast Defenses of Southern New York, the thistle is one of the emblems of Lorraine and is borne on the arms of Nancy not far from Saint-Mihiel. The crest is taken from the arms of St. Menehould in red for Artillery.  The motto translates to “We Defend.”
 Background
The distinctive unit insignia was originally approved for the 59th Artillery Regiment on 15 August 1930.  It was redesignated for the 59th Antiaircraft Artillery Battalion (Automatic Weapons) on 23 November 1953. The insignia was redesignated for the 59th Artillery Regiment on 5 December 1958.  It was redesignated effective 1 September 1971, for the 59th Air Defense Artillery Regiment.

Coat of arms

Blazon
 Shield
Per fess vair and Argent, in base a thistle Proper.
 Crest
On a wreath Argent and Azure a demi-lion rampant Gules armed and langued of the second grasping in dexter claw a sword Or. Motto:   DEFENDIMUS (We Defend).

Symbolism
 Shield
The vair on the shield is from the arms of the Coast Defenses of New York, the thistle is one of the emblems of Lorraine and is borne on the arms of Nancy not far from St. Mihiel.
 Crest
The crest it taken from the arms of St. Menehould in red for Artillery.

Background
The coat of arms was originally approved for the 59th Artillery Regiment on 1 April 1921.  It was amended to correct the motto on 28 April 1927.  It was redesignated for the 59th Antiaircraft Artillery Automatic Weapons Battalion on 21 April 1949.  The insignia was redesignated for the 59th Antiaircraft Artillery Battalion (Automatic Weapons) on 23 November 1953.  It was redesignated for the 59th Artillery Regiment on 5 December 1958.  It was redesignated effective 1 September 1971, for the 59th Air Defense Artillery Regiment.

Campaign streamers
World War I
 St Mihiel
 Meuse-Argonne
 Lorraine 1918
World War II
 Philippine Islands

Decorations
 Presidential Unit Citation (Army), Streamer Embroidered BATAAN (59th CA cited for period 29 Dec. 1941- 28 Feb. 1942)
 Presidential Unit Citation (Army), Streamer Embroidered MANILA AND SUBIC BAYS (59th CA cited for period 14 March- 9 April 1942)
 Presidential Unit Citation (Army), Streamer Embroidered DEFENSE OF THE PHILIPPINES (59th CA cited for period 7 Dec. 1941- 10 May 1942)
 Philippine Presidential Unit Citation (7 DECEMBER 1941 TO 10 MAY 1942)

See also
 Air Defense Artillery Branch
 Philippines campaign (1941–1942)
 Fort Drum (El Fraile Island)
 Seacoast defense in the United States
 United States Army Coast Artillery Corps
 Harbor Defense Command

References

 Gaines, William C., Coast Artillery Organizational History, 1917-1950, Coast Defense Journal, vol. 23, issue 2

External links
 59th Coast Artillery in France at WorldWar1.com

 Official Army lineage site for current units
 History of 3rd Bn, 59th CA at concretebattleship.org
 Photo slideshow from James Kuncken of Battery E, 59th Coast Artillery, garrison of Fort Drum
 59th Coast Artillery, Coast Artillery Journal, March 1928, p. 257
 Order of battle for 59th Coast Artillery in December 1941 at Corregidor.org

059
Military history of the Philippines
Military units and formations established in 1917
Military units and formations disestablished in 1946